William James Young (1800–1870), probably born in Philadelphia, was indentured as an apprentice to instrument maker Thomas Whitney of Philadelphia for seven years beginning in 1813.  Young was first listed in the 1825 Philadelphia directory as a mathematical instrument maker.  He continued in business by himself until 1867 when Thomas N. Watson and Charles S. Heller joined him and the firm became known as William J. Young & Co.  Young's son Alfred later took over the company and it became known as Young & Sons.  It produced surveying and other precision devices until Keuffel and Esser of New York City acquired the company in 1918.  Even then, K&E continued to offer a separate line of instruments with the Young & Sons name so as to maintain the customer base that had been built over the years.  K&E moved the Young operation to Hoboken, New Jersey, in 1922.

Instrument-making corporations
Manufacturing companies based in Philadelphia
Manufacturing companies established in 1825